Kaleida Health, founded in 1998, is a not-for-profit healthcare network that manages five hospitals in the Buffalo-Niagara Falls metropolitan area. Prior to the merger of member hospitals into the network, it was known as the Millard Fillmore Health System.

Facilities
Kaleida Health runs the Buffalo General Medical Center, a hospital on the premises of the Buffalo Niagara Medical Campus. It was founded on its current site in the mid-19th century and has undergone expansions ever since, including one in 1986 that added a 16-story tower to the main complex. The hospital had 24,000 inpatient visits in 2016. The interior lobby was remodeled and the exterior of the building was repainted in 2018 to match the color scheme of newer facilities on the campus at a cost of $2 million. Kaleida also runs the John R. Oishei Children's Hospital, a children's hospital that opened in November 2017, replacing Women and Children's Hospital of Buffalo and cost $270 million and nearly three years to build. There are 185 beds, including 64 neonatal units, 14 operating rooms, an indoor garden and skyway connections to both Buffalo General Medical Center and Conventus. The hospital broke ground in early 2015 and was designed by Shepley Bulfinch and built by Turner Construction.

Kaleida and the State University of New York at Buffalo jointly built the Gates Vascular Institute building, which was completed in 2012, replacing Millard Fillmore Gates Circle Hospital, which was demolished in October 2015; the lower floors house a clinical facility run by Kaleida that includes an emergency room, outpatient, inpatient and medical imaging facilities. As of 2017, Kaleida Health oversees Upper Allegheny Health System, which comprises Brooks Memorial Hospital, Lakeshore Hospital, Olean General, Bradford Regional Medical Center and Cuba Memorial Hospital.

Patient safety concerns
A report produced by Consumer Reports in July 2015 on the prevalence of hospital-acquired infections gave Kaleida hospitals a below average ranking in all but one category. The ranking was based on hospital-reported data provided to federal Centers for Disease Control and Prevention between October 2013 and September 2014. Kaleida Health was also cited by Medicare for having high rates of infections and other patient-safety problems.  The Hospital Acquired Conditions Reduction Program, which was created as part of the Affordable Care Act, seeks to incentivize hospitals to improve patient safety by measuring rates of hospital-acquired infection and other patient safety metrics and then penalizing hospitals that perform poorly. As a result of this program Kaleida Health has been penalized more than $1 million in 2016 through reduced Medicare payments.

References

External links
 Official website

1998 establishments in New York (state)
Companies based in Erie County, New York
Hospitals established in 1998
Healthcare in New York (state)
Hospital networks in the United States
Companies based in Buffalo, New York